Standish Fletcher Thompson (February 5, 1925 – September 13, 2022) was an American lawyer, World War II veteran and Republican politician who served as a member of the United States House of Representatives from 1967 to 1973 from the 5th Congressional District of Georgia.

Early life
Thompson was born near Atlanta in College Park in Fulton County, Georgia. He graduated from Russell High School in East Point, Georgia. While at Russell High School, Thompson was the president of the Model Airplane Club.

Military service
Thompson completed Basic Training with the 90th Infantry Division before he was transferred to the Aviation Cadet Training Program in Wichita Falls, Texas. Thompson qualified as both a pilot and as a navigator. A growing need for Army Air Corps navigators resulted in his assignment as a navigator within the 6th Emergency Air-sea Rescue Squadron. Over the next several years, Thompson would earn seven service stars along with an Asiatic–Pacific Campaign Medal. On demobilization, he attended the Methodist-affiliated Emory University in Atlanta, from which he graduated in 1949. During the Korean War, Thompson re-enlisted in the United States Air Force as a pilot.

Professional career
On returning from South Korea, Thompson graduated in 1957 from the now-closed Woodrow Wilson College of Law in Atlanta. The following year he was admitted to the Georgia bar and established a law firm in East Point. He was also president of an aviation insurance firm.

Politics

Georgia State Senate
In the November 3, 1964 general election, in which Barry M. Goldwater of Arizona became the first Republican presidential nominee to win Georgia's electoral votes, Thompson defeated then senior Democratic State Senator Charlie Brown in District 34. Thompson was one of only four Republican members of the upper chamber of the legislature at the time. He was selected by the Democratic majority to represent Fulton County in the drafting and sponsorship of the Metropolitan Rapid Transit Authority Act.

U.S. House of Representatives
Two years later, Thompson ran for Congress, becoming the first Republican since the Reconstruction era to represent Atlanta and the 5th Congressional District in the United States House. The Democratic Executive Committee chose Archie Lindsey, then the chairman of the Fulton County Commission. Lindsey had three weeks to mount a campaign. Thompson prevailed, 55,423 (60.1 percent) to Lindsey's 36,751 (39.9 percent). Thompson netted some 30 per cent of the black vote. Thompson voted in favor of the Civil Rights Act of 1968. Thompson was re-elected in 1968 and in 1970, when he defeated Andrew Young, who after the next election in 1972 in a revised district succeeded Thompson in the Fifth District.

U.S. Senate campaign
In 1972, Thompson ran for the U.S. Senate. Sam Nunn defeated David Gambrell in the Democratic primary; Gambrell had been appointed by then Governor Jimmy Carter to succeed the late Richard B. Russell Jr. Thompson lost to Nunn, 362,501 votes (46.5 percent) to 404,890 (52 percent).

Post-political career and death
After leaving the U.S. House, Thompson returned to his law firm in Atlanta. In 1985, he was made a member of the Atlanta Regional Commission. From 2009 until 2011, Thompson served as the Commander of the Atlanta World War II Roundtable, an organization that was created in 1986 "to hear and record the war experiences of World War II and to pass on to posterity the knowledge of World War II and the price – human and material – that was paid by our nation for the preservation of freedom in the United States and the world".

Thompson died on September 13, 2022, at the age of 97.

See also
 List of members of the House Un-American Activities Committee

References

 Retrieved on 2008-01-24

External links
 Retrieved on 2008-01-24

|-

1925 births
2022 deaths
Georgia (U.S. state) lawyers
American businesspeople in insurance
Republican Party Georgia (U.S. state) state senators
Emory University alumni
People from College Park, Georgia
Politicians from Atlanta
People from Marietta, Georgia
Military personnel from Georgia (U.S. state)
United States Army personnel of World War II
United States Army Air Forces personnel of World War II
United States Air Force personnel of the Korean War
American Korean War pilots
United States Army soldiers
United States Air Force officers
Candidates in the 1972 United States elections
Republican Party members of the United States House of Representatives from Georgia (U.S. state)